Alfred McMichael (1 October 1927 – 7 January 2006) was a footballer who played as a left back.

Belfast-born McMichael began his career at Linfield, before signing for Newcastle United in 1949. He remained at Newcastle until 1962, appearing 433 times and scoring once for the club. He was part of the team that won the 1952 FA Cup Final, after his disappointment of missing the final the year before through injury. At one point he was considered the best left-back in Britain and was a popular player amongst Newcastle United supporters.

He represented Northern Ireland 40 times.

After retiring from playing, he managed South Shields from 1963 until 1969, guiding them to the North Regional League title in 1966–67.

Honours

As a player
Newcastle United
FA Cup winner: 1952

As a manager
South Shields
North Regional League champions 1966–67

References

External links
 Obituary from PFA
 
 

1927 births
2006 deaths
1958 FIFA World Cup players
Linfield F.C. players
Newcastle United F.C. players
Association footballers from Northern Ireland
Northern Ireland international footballers
Association footballers from Belfast
English Football League players
Association football fullbacks
Football managers from Northern Ireland
Gateshead United F.C. managers
FA Cup Final players